Human is the fourth studio album by American death metal band Death, released on October 22, 1991, by Relativity Records. The album marked the beginning of a major stylistic change for Death, being more technically complex and progressive than the band's previous efforts. The lyrics are more introspective when compared to the gore-based lyrics of Scream Bloody Gore and Leprosy or the social commentary on Spiritual Healing. This new style would continue to evolve on all following Death albums. This is the only album to feature Cynic members Paul Masvidal on guitars and Sean Reinert on drums, both 20 at the time, and the first to feature bassist Steve DiGiorgio.

Bassist Steve DiGiorgio left after the recording of the album (though he would later return to record Individual Thought Patterns). He was replaced by Scott Carino, who toured with the band in 1991 and 1992. Carino also recorded additional bass overdub on "Cosmic Sea" after a couple of issues were discovered during the mixing stage. The rest of the song (including the bass solo) was recorded by DiGiorgio.

In 2011, Relapse Records and Perseverance Holdings Ltd. re-issued the album to commemorate the 20th anniversary of the original release. This edition was remixed by Jim Morris of Morrisound Recording Studios, includes bonus tracks, and was authorized by Schuldiner intellectual property lawyer Eric Greif. The reissue of Human was remixed, as Sony had lost the master tapes of Scott Burns' original mixes.

Human was released to critical acclaim from music publications and is seen as a pivotal release in the development of the technical death metal subgenre and on extreme metal in general. In 2017, Rolling Stone magazine ranked the album as the 70th greatest metal album of all time on its list of "The 100 Greatest Metal Albums of All Time".

Reception

Human is a highly influential extreme metal album, according to Jeff Wagner in his 2010 text on progressive metal, Mean Deviation. It is Death's best-selling album, having sold 100,000 copies in the United States by 1995. It was ranked number 82 on the October 2006 issue of Guitar World magazine's list of the greatest 100 guitar albums of all time. The track "Lack of Comprehension" has an accompanying music video, which received airplay on MTV and helped boost the sales of  the album. As of March 2023, the music video has over 7 million views of YouTube.

As of 2008, Human had sold over 600,000 copies worldwide, with the U.S. Soundscan listed as 100,000 units.

Track listing
All songs written by Chuck Schuldiner except where noted.

Personnel
All information is taken from the CD liner notes of the original 1991 release and the 2011 reissue.

Death 
 Chuck Schuldiner – vocals, guitar
 Paul Masvidal – guitar
 Steve Di Giorgio – bass
 Sean Reinert – drums

Additional personnel 
 Scott Carino – additional bass (on "Cosmic Sea") 
 Bill Andrews – drums (August 1990 rehearsal)
 Terry Butler – bass (August 1990 rehearsal)

Production 
 Chuck Schuldiner – production
 Scott Burns – producer, engineer, mixing
 Michael Fuller – mastering (original release)
 Jim Morris – remixing  (2011 reissue)
 Alan Douches – mastering (2011 reissue)
 René Miville – artwork
 Tim Hubbard – photography
 David Bett – art direction
 Jacob Speis – layout

Notes
"God of Thunder" was originally only on the Japanese version of the album but was later included on the 2011 Relapse reissue.
 The track, "Cosmic Sea", is featured in the computer game Damage Incorporated.
 The band paid homage in the liner notes to Atheist bassist Roger Patterson, who was killed in an auto accident in February 1991.
The band's logo presents a change: compared to the three predecessors, it loses the drops of blood that flow downwards and the spider's web on the "D".

Sales

Charts

Album
Billboard (North America)

References 

1991 albums
Death (metal band) albums
Relativity Records albums
Relapse Records albums
Albums produced by Scott Burns (record producer)
Albums recorded at Morrisound Recording